Wag Kukurap (international title: Don't Blink) is a Philippine television reality horror show broadcast by GMA Network. Hosted by Dingdong Dantes, it premiered on August 28, 2004. The show concluded on April 29, 2006 with a total of 86 episodes.

The series is streaming online on YouTube.

Premise

The show is divided into two parts, each containing a true paranormal story from True Philippine Ghost Stories and Haunted Philippines. During the intermission, a photograph of ghostly figures is shown and later on the background revealed. Contests are sometimes held where participants must decide which of two pictures is real. At the end, footage of "real life ghosts" encountered by people is shown.

References

External links
 
 

2004 Philippine television series debuts
2006 Philippine television series endings
Filipino-language television shows
GMA Network original programming
Philippine reality television series